The IEEE Transactions on Signal Processing is a biweekly peer-reviewed scientific journal published by the Institute of Electrical and Electronics Engineers covering research on signal processing. It was established in 1953 as the IRE Transactions on Audio, renamed to IEEE Transactions on Audio and Electroacoustics in 1966 and to IEEE Transactions on Acoustics, Speech, and Signal Processing in 1974, before obtaining its current name in 1992. The journal is abstracted and indexed in MEDLINE/PubMed and the Science Citation Index Expanded. According to the Journal Citation Reports, the journal has a 2019 impact factor of 5.230. The editor-in-chief is Pier Luigi Dragotti (EEE Department Imperial College London.

References

External links 
 

Engineering journals
IEEE academic journals
Biweekly journals
Publications established in 1953
English-language journals